John Frederick Anderson (December 11, 1885 – November 8, 1957) was an American baseball player. He played for Davidson College in 1906, but later transferred to the Maryland Agricultural College (later the University of Maryland), where he played from 1907 to 1909. Anderson played in Boston in 1909 but did not play major league baseball again for the Red Sox again until due to his practicing dentistry. In 1914, he jumped to the Federal League to play for Buffalo for the 1914 and 1915 seasons.

In 1916, he was sold to the New York Giants and Anderson played with them for three seasons. He pitched for the Giants in the 1917 World Series against the Chicago White Sox.

Anderson committed suicide on November 8, 1957, in his Winston-Salem, North Carolina home.

See also
List of Major League Baseball annual ERA leaders
List of Major League Baseball annual saves leaders

References

External links

1885 births
1957 suicides
Major League Baseball pitchers
National League ERA champions
Boston Red Sox players
Buffalo Buffeds players
Buffalo Blues players
New York Giants (NL) players
Worcester Busters players
Wilson Tobacconists players
Brockton Shoemakers players
Davidson Wildcats baseball players
Maryland Terrapins baseball players
Baseball players from Winston-Salem, North Carolina
Suicides by firearm in North Carolina